The lake Whitton is a lake located near the village of Nantes in Estrie. It is the source of the Noire River, a tributary of Grand lac Saint François and a sub-tributary of the St. Lawrence River.

Geography 

Even if the lake is located only a few kilometers from Lake Mégantic and Lake Mckenzie, its outlet flows into the neighboring watershed as far as Grand lac Saint-François, source of the Saint-François River.

Tourism 
The "Chemin du Lac-Whitton" provides access to the lake and is located in an environment of nature and forest.

References 

Lakes of Estrie
Le Granit Regional County Municipality